Jeong Hyeon-cheol (Korean: 정현철; born February 21, 1972), better known as Seo Taiji or Seo Tae-ji (서태지), is a South Korean singer, musician, songwriter and record producer. After dropping out of high school to pursue a music career, he rose to become one of the most prominent and influential cultural icons in South Korea, with many referring to him as "the President of Culture".

Following a brief stint in the heavy metal band Sinawe, Taiji formed Seo Taiji and Boys in 1991 with whom he found immediate success. Their style of music, dance, fashion, and self-presentation resonated with the young generation—termed the sinsedae, "new generation." They incorporated elements of popular musical genres from the West and contributed considerably larger to Korean pop culture and Korean pop's development in the 1990s. His songs addressed social and political concerns of the youth including the stressful and stifling system of education in Korea, and the rage of youth in the face of poor social and economic outlook. Widespread youth backlash to government suppression of the social commentary in his music became a catalyst for the abolishment of censorship of Korean popular music lyrics. His career paved the way for free expression in Korean pop music. Although he initially announced retirement upon disbanding the group in 1996, Taiji released his first solo album two years later and continued his successful career.

Biography

Early career with Sinawe
At an early age, Jeong Hyeon-cheol had a fascination with music. At 14, he participated in several amateur rock bands. He took the stage name of "Seo Taiji" at age 17, when he was recruited into the heavy metal band Sinawe as bass guitarist by Shin Daechul. He chose to drop out of school because he felt that continuing to be enrolled in school would not be useful in pursuing a career in music.

Seo Taiji and Boys: 1992–1996

Seo Taiji and Boys was a seminal South Korean boy band. Although also including Yang Hyun-suk and Lee Juno, Taiji was the leader and main songwriter and began his signature of mixing many different genres of music. They had several controversies with songs and lyrics, but became the first modern highly successful band in the South Korean music industry. The popularity of their music marked a departure from the trot style of music that previously dominated Korea's popular music scene.

Solo career: 1998–present

1998: Seo Tai Ji
Two years after Seo Taiji and Boys' retirement, Taiji resumed his career as a musician and solo act, which has been and continues to be successful. He sought to return to his true roots and perform rock music. Without any appearances or activity in South Korea, he released an album with a couple of music videos in 1998. There was some controversy over his sudden reversal of retirement, but his first Solo album Seo Tai Ji sold more than a million copies, even without any promotion in Korea. His first solo work included heavy metal and nu metal songs, but the main genre was still alternative rock. Although it was his first solo work, fans refer to it as his 5th album.

2000–2001: Ultramania 
In 2000, he returned to South Korea after a four-year absence. On the day of his arrival at the Kimpo International Airport in Seoul, the entire airport had been crowded by thousands of fans and media trying to get the first look at Seo Taiji.

He released the album Ultramania which consisted of nu metal and Hardcore punk. His solo act had an effect on many South Korean boy bands such as H.O.T. and caused them to decline in popularity. His songs "Internet War" and "Ultramania" were the biggest hits of the year. After the first ETPFEST in 2001, which he founded during his comeback, Taiji was presented with hide of X Japan's Fernandes MG-360S guitar, which is yellow with pink hearts, by hide's parents and his brother, Hiroshi, to celebrate the success of ETPFEST and the first hide showcase tribute ever at a Korean rock festival.

2004: 7th Issue
Seo Taiji maintained his nu metal sound in his third solo album, 7th Issue. However, unlike Ultramania, 7th Issue was recorded mostly on a dropped C tuning, which gave the effect of the album sounding like one long song. Nevertheless, it had no problem attracting attention to a wide range of audiences. 7th Issue's catchy rock tune made his fans call it "punk rock". Also, he obviously added Drum and Bass sound into his several songs, so that it proved him to be a favorable electronica musician (skills he learned from producing the "Seo Taiji and Boys" albums). J from Luna Sea also participated in the making of this album as the bassist.  His song "Live Wire" was a good hit succeeding the vivacity of "Ultramania". "Robot" deals with his youth and anguish, while the song "F.M.Business" acrimoniously criticize the issues of and the commercialized music business and the artist exploitation from greedy corporate record labels. He also touches on the issue of abortion along with sexism and sexual assault with the song, "Victim". His record sale was reduced to a half million due to on-line downloading services, but was still the highest selling record of 2004 in South Korea. Taiji proved himself to be a musician in top popularity for more than a decade. After being active up to 2005, he once again suddenly disappeared out of the spotlight.

2008–2009: 8th Atomos 

Seo returned to South Korea after a long absence, and revealed his latest single "Moai". It was the first release of Seo Taiji's ambitious 3-part "mystery project", which was followed by another single, "Bermuda Triangle" which was put up as a digital single. The third part, Atomos Part Secret, was released on March 10. He had a promotion called "Missing Taiji", where there were false rumors that Taiji went missing, only to return on the "Wormhole" concert day. In his single "Moai", Taiji reinvents his sound, and introduces a new experimental style he calls "nature pound". "Moai" draws inspiration from the mysterious statues of Easter Island which had long fascinated him since his childhood. He performed at the 2008 ETPFEST which he spearheaded to promote his comeback alongside bands such as The Used, Dragon Ash, Death Cab for Cutie and Marilyn Manson.

Seo also put together "The Great Seotaiji Symphony" with Tolga Kashif and the Royal Philharmonic Orchestra to perform his old hits and new songs presented in an entirely new form, combining rock and classical music. The main concert was held at the Seoul World Cup Stadium. After the main concert, there were complaints about the sound quality not being delivered to the second and third floors at the further ends of the stadium and to make up for this mistake, another encore performance (same setlist) was held in December at a closed/indoor venue, Jamsil Gymnasium upgraded with better sound systems.

Seo's second single, following Atomos Part Moai, called Atomos Part Secret was released on March 10, 2009. It is the same date as the arrival of the Mars Reconnaissance Orbiter (MRO) to Mars in 2006. Taiji also held a concert promoting his second single on March 14 and 15. Tickets for the concert, cryptically titled Wormhole, sold out in just 20 minutes.

Seo's 15th anniversary album consisted of most of his works so far, re-recorded and re-mastered but it was released in a limited edition with only 15,000 copies available, each with unique serial numbers. Serial numbers #1–15 were purchased by Seotaiji himself.  He kept No. 1 for himself, gave No. 2 and No. 3 to his old time friends Lee Juno and Yang Hyun Suk, and the rest to his close friends.  Since the re-recorded and re-mastered songs were only available for the limited anniversary album and not all the fans were able to purchase it, he decided to re-release all the albums with the containing the new versions. On April 3, the first two Seo Taiji and Boys Albums were rereleased. Taiji will rerelease all 7 of his albums, from Nan Arayo! to 7th Issue. On May 25, the 3rd and 4th Seo Taiji and Boys albums were rereleased.

On June 13, Seo held a nationwide tour named "The Möbius". The first of the concerts was held in Seoul, Korea. The tour has ended, but a repeat performance was given 2 months after the finish. ETPFEST 2009 was also held with guest groups such as NIN, Limp Bizkit, Keane, Fade, Boom Boom Satellites, Pia and GUMX.

2014–2015: Quiet Night

In 2013, Seo Taiji announced that he had been working on a new album. The first single from the new album, "Sogyeokdong", was released in October 2014. The single was released in two parts: first part, a collaboration with IU, was released October 2, and the second part on October 10. The album, Quiet Night, was released on October 20.

2017–present: Seo Taiji 25 Project
In April 2017 it was announced that Seo Taiji was assembling a group of modern K-Pop acts to cover songs from his past to celebrate the 25th anniversary of his debut with Seo Taiji and Boys. The first act announced for the project was BTS, with other acts including Urban Zakapa and Younha. The first single from this project, a cover of "Come Back Home" (from Seo Taiji and Boys IV) recorded by BTS, was released with a music video on July 5, 2017. The next song, a cover of "Moai" (from Atomos), was released on July 11, performed by Urban Zakapa.

Personal life
On April 21, 2011, Sports Seoul broke the story (later confirmed by numerous media outlets) that Seo Taiji had secretly married actress Lee Ji-ah (real name Kim Sang-eun) from October 12, 1997, until August 9, 2006. Their union was kept secret because both Seo and Lee notoriously kept their personal lives hidden from the media. Since the shocking news of Seo and Lee's past union, some have speculated that this was the reason why Lee's past had been undetectable. The couple first met in 1993, and after Seo temporarily retired in 1996, they got married in 1997 and lived in Atlanta and Arizona, until Seo's return to Korea in June 2000. They were separated since the return. Lee filed for divorce in the U.S. in 2006, citing both lifestyle and personality differences. According to Seo, the divorce was finalized in 2006, which Lee disputed, stating it had been 2009. After a six-month lawsuit, an out-of-court settlement was reached on the alimony and division of assets in July 2011. In August 2014, Seo released a statement denying several of Lee's claims about their marriage when she made a guest appearance on the talk show Healing Camp, Aren't You Happy.

Seo married actress Lee Eun-sung on June 26, 2013, at Seo's newly built home in affluent Pyeongchang-dong in northern Seoul (he used to live in Yeonhui-dong), with only family members present. They met in 2008 when Lee appeared in the music video for "Bermuda Triangle" (on Seo's eighth album), and began dating in late 2009. Their first child, a daughter, was born on August 27, 2014.

Seo Taiji Band
Although Taiji now works as a "solo" artist, the following musicians consistently play with him during tours, studio recordings, and music videos. Some of them belong to other bands, but they participated in recording and performances for a short period of time.:

Top (Ahn Seong-hoon) – lead guitar
Rock (Choi Chang-rok) – rhythm guitar
Sang Uk (Monkey) – bass
Heff "The Machine" Holter – drums
Kim Seok-jung (김석중) – keyboards/programming/samples/arrangement for Seo's 8th album
Kang Joon-hyung (강준형) – bass for Seo's 8th and 9th albums. He normally works with the band "A'ccel in a story".
Choi Hyun-jin (최현진) – drums for Seo's 8th and 9th albums. He normally works with the band "Vassline"
Doc Skim (닥스킴) – keyboards for Seo's 9th album

Discography

Studio albums

Live releases
 Seotaiji Band Live Album 2000/2001 (2001)
 6th Album Re-recording & ETPFEST Live (2003)
 Seotaiji Live Tour Zero '04 (2005)
 The Great Seotaiji Symphony (2009)
 2009 Seotaiji Band Live Tour [The Möbius] (2010)

Singles and EPs
 Feel the Soul (2001, Single) (Japan-exclusive)
 8th Atomos Part Moai (2008, EP)
 8th Atomos Part Secret (2009, EP)

DVD
 Seo Taiji Live Tour '2000–2001: The Taiji Speaks (2001)
 Seo Taiji Live Tour Zero '04 DVD + Art Book (2004)
 2004 Seo Taiji Record of the 7th (2005)
 The Shedding Bird: Seo Taiji Company DVD + Art Book (2005)
 The Great 2008 Seotaiji Symphony with Tolga Kashif & Royal Philharmonic (2010)
 Seotaiji Live Tour: The Möbius (2011)
 ETP Festival 08 09 Seo Taiji (2013)

Blu-ray
 The Great 2008 Seotaiji Symphony with Tolga Kashif & Royal Philharmonic (2010)
 Atomos: The Film (2011)
 Seotaiji Live Tour: The Möbius (2011)
 Seo Taiji Record of The 8th 398 (2012)

Box sets
 [&] Seotaiji 15th Anniversary Album Box Set (2007)

Awards and nominations

References

External links 

 

1972 births
Living people
Musicians from Seoul
Nu metal singers
Singers from Seoul
South Korean pop rock singers
South Korean record producers
South Korean rock musicians
South Korean bass guitarists
South Korean guitarists
MAMA Award winners
Multi-instrumentalists
Male bass guitarists
21st-century South Korean male singers
21st-century bass guitarists